Gustavo Alberto Bentos Gómez (born December 14, 1976) is a Uruguayan footballer who last played for Charlotte Eagles in the USL Second Division.

Career

Club
Bentos spent most of his early professional career in Uruguay, Bolivia and Chile. In Bolivia, Bentos scored 19 goals in 35 games, and was third in scoring for the First Division of Bolivia. In 2005 Bentos played for Fernández Vial, scoring 13 goals in 20 games, before moving to Chilean club Deportes Copiapó in 2007.

Bentos signed with Charlotte Eagles of the USL Second Division in 2008, but struggled with injuries during his first season, and was limited to just three appearances and one goal.

He retired from being a  professional soccer player  this 2011

International
Bentos has a great deal of international experience, having played with the U-17, U-20 and U-23 Uruguayan national teams.

References

External links
 Charlotte Eagles bio
  S.Wanderers- Palestino 2003

1976 births
Living people
Uruguayan footballers
Uruguayan expatriate footballers
Maccabi Tel Aviv F.C. players
C.A. Bella Vista players
C.A. Progreso players
Montevideo Wanderers F.C. players
Santiago Wanderers footballers
C.D. Arturo Fernández Vial footballers
Deportes Temuco footballers
Deportes Copiapó footballers
Deportes La Serena footballers
Magallanes footballers
Club Real Potosí players
Charlotte Eagles players
Primera B de Chile players
Chilean Primera División players
Expatriate footballers in Chile
Expatriate footballers in Bolivia
Expatriate footballers in Israel
USL Second Division players
Association football forwards